Cailey Presley Fleming is an American actress. She is known for her role as Judith Grimes on the AMC horror-drama television series The Walking Dead (2018–2022), and as young versions of Rey and Sylvie in Star Wars: The Force Awakens (2015) and Loki (2021) respectively.

Early life and career 
Fleming was born in Picayune, Mississippi. At age 8, she began acting professionally first gaining attention in Star Wars: The Force Awakens, portraying a young Rey. Fleming began to portray Judith Grimes in The Walking Dead during season nine and became a series regular beginning with season ten. She briefly appeared in Loki episode four as young Sylvie. On January 25, 2022, Fleming was cast as John Krasinski's imaginary friend in the comedy IF.

Filmography

Film

Television

References

External links

 

Living people
Actresses from Mississippi
American television actresses
American film actresses
American child actresses
21st-century American actresses
People from Picayune, Mississippi
Year of birth missing (living people)